LIM and calponin homology domains-containing protein 1 is a protein that in humans is encoded by the LIMCH1 gene.

References

Further reading